Save Me Plz is a fantasy short story by American writer David Barr Kirtley. The story originally appeared in the October 2007 issue of Realms of Fantasy magazine, and was selected for the anthology Fantasy: The Best of the Year, 2008 Edition.  It subsequently appeared in the 2015 anthology of gaming-themed fiction PRESS START TO PLAY.

Plot summary

Months after Meg breaks up with Devon due to his video game addiction, she learns that he has vanished without a trace. She sets out to find him, traveling through a world full of fantasy elements such as magic swords and giant spiders, which she seems to regard as normal.

Reception

Locus placed "Save Me Plz" on their recommended reading list for 2007. The New York Journal of Books called it "one of the best tales in [PRESS START TO PLAY]]."

References

External links
"Save Me Plz" in text format
"Save Me Plz" in podcast format
"Save Me Plz" video on YouTube

2007 short stories
Works originally published in American magazines
Works originally published in fantasy fiction magazines